Arippu Bridge (also known as the Thallady-Arippu Bridge) is a road bridge across Aruvi Aru (Malvathu Oya) in north western Sri Lanka. The bridge was formally opened on 16 October 2011.

The bridge cost 540 million rupees (US$4.9 million) and was financed by a soft loan from the British Government's Steel Bridge Programme. The bridge is part of the B403 South Coast Road which connects Mannar with Puttalam.

References

2011 establishments in Sri Lanka
Bridges completed in 2011
Bridges in Mannar District